These squads consisted of a maximum of 15 players.

Teams

Angola

The following is the Angola roster in the women's handball tournament of the 2004 Summer Olympics.

Head coaches: Pavel Dzhenev

Brazil

The following is the Brazil roster in the women's handball tournament of the 2004 Summer Olympics.

Head coach: Alexandre Schneider

China

The following is the China roster in the women's handball tournament of the 2004 Summer Olympics.

Head coaches: Chung Hyungkyun

Denmark

The following is the Denmark roster in the women's handball tournament of the 2004 Summer Olympics.

Head coaches: Jan Pytlick

France

The following is the France roster in the women's handball tournament of the 2004 Summer Olympics.

Head coaches: Olivier Krumbholz

Greece

The following is the Greece roster in the women's handball tournament of the 2004 Summer Olympics.

Head coaches: Svein Andre Olsen

Hungary

The following is the Hungary roster in the women's handball tournament of the 2004 Summer Olympics.

Head coaches: Lajos Mocsai

South Korea

The following is the South Korea roster in the women's handball tournament of the 2004 Summer Olympics.

Head coaches: Lim Young-chul

Spain

The following is the Spain roster in the women's handball tournament of the 2004 Summer Olympics.

Head coaches: Jose Aldeguer

Ukraine

The following is the Ukraine roster in the women's handball tournament of the 2004 Summer Olympics.

Head coaches: Leonid Ratner

References

External links
2004 Summer Olympics Official Report

Women's team squads
2004
Olymp
Women's events at the 2004 Summer Olympics